The Workers Film and Photo League was an organization of filmmakers, photographers, writers and projectionists in the 1930s, dedicated to using film and photography for social change.

History 

Founded in 1930, the WFPL produced documentaries of the U.S. labor movement including the National Hunger marches of 1931 and 1932 and the Bonus March 1932. These newsreels were generally not distributed to mainstream theaters, but shown at party or trade union events.  When shown in theaters, they often opened for films produced in Europe or the Soviet Union.  In New York, the "Harry Alan Potamkin Film School" was established by the Workers Film and Photo League to train working-class filmmakers.

Initially affiliated with the Workers International Relief, the group first organized to project films at fundraising events for striking workers.

Although the best known chapter of the WFPL was in New York, groups in Los Angeles, Chicago, Detroit, and other cities created and screened documentaries under the "Film and Photo League" moniker.  Nationally, the Film & Photo Leagues emerged as a loosely knit alliance of local organizations that provided leftist visual propaganda. Their efforts during the years of the early Depression helped to define social documentary film and photography as a genre.

Much has been made of the association of the Workers Film and Photo League with Communism, both in the United States and abroad. While many members were self identified Marxists and Communist Party USA members, the groups usually functioned independently.  They were largely composed of idealists who saw the documentary film as a vital element of the movement for radical social change.

In 1933 "Workers" was dropped from the title and the New York organization became the Film and Photo League. The FPL survived for another year in New York, where its photographers formed the Photo League. Some filmmakers formed an independent private production company, others founded Nykino and some, later, the Frontier Film Group.

In other cities, such as Chicago and Los Angeles, Film and Photo League activities continued throughout the 1930s.

Members of the WFPL

New York 
 Lester Balog
 Tom Brandon
 Sam Brody
 Robert Del Duca
 Arnold S. Eagle
 Leo Hurwitz
 Lewis Jacobs
 Vic Kandel
 Irving Lerner
 Jay Leyda
 Nancy Naumberg
 David Platt
 Harry Alan Potamkin
 Julian Roffman
 Leo Seltzer
 Ralph Steiner

Chicago
 Maurice Baillen
 Conrad Friberg, aka C.O. Nelson
 John Freitag
 Gordon Koster
 William Kruck
 John Masek
 Dr. William J. Twig

Detroit
 Joseph Hudyma
 Jack Auringer

San Francisco
 Lester Balog
 Otto Hagel
 Hansel Mieth

Los Angeles
 Louis Siminow

Film and Photo League films 

Although many of the films produced by the Film and Photo Leagues were destroyed in a 1935 storage fire in New York, some surviving films can be found at the Museum of Modern Art Film Study Center, New York; Film Center, School of the Art Institute of Chicago; and the Library of Congress, Washington D.C.  A filmography was created by researchers in the 1970s.

 National Hunger March
 Bonus March
 Detroit Ford Massacre
 Workers Newsreels
 Halsted Street
 The Great Depression
 Century of Progress
 Berry Strike

References

Further reading
 Campbell, Russell. "Film and Photo League: Radical cinema in the 30s". Jump Cut: A Review of Contemporary Media, no. 14, 1977, pp. 23–25. Retrieved August 24, 2006.
Campbell, Russell. Cinema Strikes Back: Radical Filmmaking in the United States 1930-1942. Ann Arbor: UMI Research Press, 1982
Campbell, Russell and Alexander, William. "Film and Photo League Filmography", Jump Cut, no. 14, 1977, p. 33
Brandon, Tom "Survival List: Films of the Great Depression" in Platt, David, ed. Celluloid Power: Social Film Criticism from "The Birth of a Nation" to "Judgment at Nuremberg", Metuchen, N.J: Scarecrow Press, 1992.
Seltzer, Leo. Documenting the Depression of the 1930s: The Work of the Film and Photo League in Platt, David, ed. Celluloid Power: Social Film Criticism from the "Birth of a Nation" to "Judgment at Nuremberg", Metuchen, NJ: Scarecrow Press: 1992
Fred Sweet, Eugene Rosow and Allan Francovich, "Pioneers: An Interview with Tom Brandon", Film Quarterly 26: 5 (Fall, 1973): 12.
Leshne, Carla. The Film & Photo League of San Francisco. Film History: An International Journal - Volume 18, Number 4, 2006, pp. 361–373.
Alexander, William.  'Film on the Left: American Documentary Film From 1931 to 1942. Princeton, N.J.: Princeton University Press, 1981
Denning, Michael. The Cultural Front: The Laboring of American Culture in the Twentieth Century.  Verso, 1997
Daniel Frontino Elash. "Exploring New Sources on the Workers Film and Photo League", in Overcoming Silence, 9 June 2010

American artist groups and collectives
Photojournalism organizations
Social documentary photography
Documentary film organizations
1930s in the United States
Great Depression in the United States
Communist Party USA mass organizations
Arts organizations established in 1930